The 1991 Drink Drive Sandown 500 was an endurance race for Group 3A Touring Cars. The event was held on 8 September 1991 at the Sandown circuit in Victoria, Australia over 161 laps of the 3.10 km "long" circuit, totalling 499 km. The race was the first round of both the 1991 Australian Endurance Championship and the 1991 Australian Manufacturers' Championship.

The race was won by first time winners Mark Gibbs and Rohan Onslow driving for the Bob Forbes Corporation Pty. Ltd.  in just their second race since taking delivery of their new Gibson Motorsport developed Nissan Skyline GT-R. There were six classified finishers, the smallest number in the history of the Sandown 500 touring car race.

Qualifying results

Race results

Statistics
 Pole Position - 1:14.17 - #30 Glenn Seton - Ford Sierra RS500
 Fastest Lap - 1:15.74 - #4 Mark Gibbs - Nissan Skyline R32 GT-R

See also
1991 Australian Touring Car season

References

External links

Motorsport at Sandown
Don't Drink Drive Sandown 500
Pre-Bathurst 500